Cheonjibong (Gangwon-do) (천지봉 / 天地峰) is a mountain of South Korea. It has an altitude of 1087 metres.

See also
List of mountains of Korea

References

Mountains of South Korea
Mountains of Gangwon Province, South Korea